The 2014 Boys' Youth NORCECA Volleyball Championship was the nine edition of the bi-annual men's volleyball tournament, played by nine countries from July 12–20, 2014 in Tulsa, Oklahoma, United States. The United States win this second title. USA, Cuba and Mexico qualifier to the 2015 FIVB Boys' World Championship.

Competing Nations

Pool standing procedure
Match won 3–0: 5 points for the winner, 0 point for the loser
Match won 3–1: 4 points for the winner, 1 points for the loser
Match won 3–2: 3 points for the winner, 2 points for the loser
In case of tie, the teams were classified according to the following criteria:
points ratio and sets ratio

First round

Pool A

Pool B

Final round

Championship bracket

Quarterfinals

Semifinals

Classification 5-6

Classification 3-4

Final

Final standing

All-Star Team

Most Valuable Player

Best Setter

Best Opposite

Best Outside Hitters

Best Middle Blockers

Best Libero

References

Men's NORCECA Volleyball Championship